John Richard Worsfold (born 25 September 1968) is a former Australian rules football coach and player. He was the senior coach of the Essendon Football Club in the Australian Football League (AFL) between October 2015 and September 2020. He previously had a long association with the West Coast Eagles as player (1987–1998) and coach (2002–2013), captaining the club to premierships in 1992 and 1994 and coaching the club to a premiership in 2006.

Worsfold began his career with the South Fremantle Football Club in the West Australian Football League (WAFL), before being named an inaugural squad member of West Coast on their formation in 1986. After winning the club's best and fairest award in 1988, he was appointed the captain of the club in 1991, a position he would hold until his retirement in 1998. During his period at the club, Worsfold played in 209 games, which including the 1992 and 1994 premiership sides. During this time, he also appeared in five State of Origin matches for Western Australia, including captaining his state twice.

In 2000, two years after his retirement from playing, Worsfold joined  as an assistant coach, remaining in this position until the end of the 2001 season, when he was appointed senior coach of West Coast in place of Ken Judge. Worsfold coached the club in eight finals series, including the 2006 premiership. In 2010, he coached West Coast to its first wooden spoon, but the following season the team finished fourth, with Worsfold receiving the AFLCA Coach of the Year Award for the second time. He coached West Coast in a club record 274 games before resigning at the end of the 2013 season. He was named an inaugural inductee into the West Australian Football Hall of Fame in 2004 and the John Worsfold Medal is named in his honour.

He handed over to his assistant Ben Rutten at the end of the 2020 season as part of a planned transition.

Early life 
Born in Subiaco, and growing up in the southern suburbs of Perth, Western Australia, Worsfold attended South Fremantle Senior High School in Beaconsfield, graduating in 1985.

Playing career 
Worsfold fell into the South Fremantle Football Club's recruitment zone, he played in the club's underage teams, and also played in the Western Australia under-18 team that won the state's first Teal Cup in 1985. Worsfold made his senior WAFL debut for South Fremantle in 1986, and played a total of 19 games in his debut season, leading him to be awarded the Rookie of the Year award by the Daily News. At South Fremantle, he also won "Player of the Future" and "Best First Year Player" awards in 1985 and 1986, respectively.

West Coast Eagles
In October 1986, Worsfold was named as a member of the West Coast Eagles' inaugural 32-man squad. He made his senior debut for the club in round four of the 1987 season, against  at Princes Park. Worsfold played a total of 11 games in the club's inaugural season and also played five games in the WAFL for South Fremantle. The following season, he cemented his role in the side playing every game except for two games missed due to suspension in rounds nine and ten. At the end of the season, Worsfold was awarded the Club Champion Award as West Coast's best and fairest, winning by ten votes from runner-up Guy McKenna. Worsfold led West Coast in disposals, kicks, and tackles in 1988.

Worsfold had similar seasons in 1989 and 1990. Having been appointed vice-captain prior to the start of the 1989 season, he took on greater leadership roles under the influence of new coach Michael Malthouse. Worsfold captained the club to premierships in 1992 and 1994, and retired at the end of the 1998 season, having played 209 games for the club.

Playing style

Worsfold began his career as a midfielder but moved to a position on the half-back flank later in his career, where he played most of his football. Considered one of the club's toughest and most courageous players, he was suspended twice in his career, both times for striking.

Worsfold was named on a half-back flank in West Coast's "Team of the Decade" in 1996, and in the same position in teams named for the 20-year and 25-year anniversaries of the club's first season. He was an inaugural inductee into the West Australian Football Hall of Fame in 2004, and an inaugural inductee into the West Coast Eagles Hall of Fame in 2011. The Australian Football Hall of Fame's selection process has been criticised for precluding Worsfold's induction, as the Hall of Fame prohibits selectors from considering a person based on a combination of their playing and coaching careers. A function room at Subiaco Oval, the John Worsfold Room was also named after Worsfold.

Post-Playing career and Channel 7 commentator 
For the first year after the end of his playing career, Worsfold worked as a commentator with Channel 7.

Coaching career

Carlton Football Club assistant coach (2000-2001)
At the end of 1999, Worsfold confirmed that he was interested in coaching and that he was willing to move away from Perth in order to do so. He had also been in contention for the position of senior coach at  but declined to be interviewed after accepting the role at Carlton. Worsfold's appointment was controversial; Carlton's president John Elliott officially confirmed Worsfold had been engaged as assistant coach on The Footy Show, two days before the club was due to play in a preliminary final. Carlton's senior coach David Parkin suggested the appointment had come "out of the blue", and it was later reported that he had threatened to quit as a result of the club's lack of consultation.

His coaching career started in 2000 at Carlton Football Club as an assistant coach under senior coach David Parkin and then under senior coach Wayne Brittain in 2001.

In the 2000 season, As part of a restructure of Carlton's coaching panel, Parkin moved to more of an overseeing role, with his senior assistant coach, Wayne Brittain, given a greater role. Under this structure, Worsfold was given responsibility for coaching the defence, including formulating the club's kick-in strategy. Having maintained his role as a defensive coach under Brittain, Worsfold was again considered a strong candidate for several other clubs' vacant senior coaching positions during (and at the conclusion of) the 2001 season. After Damian Drum's sacking as senior coach of Fremantle midway through the season, Worsfold was approached to interview for the position, but refused, stating a desire to wait until the end of the season. He was considered likely to take up the position at Fremantle, with Neil Craig considered a favourite to coach West Coast, but eventually leveraged his status at Fremantle into securing the West Coast position.

West Coast Eagles senior coach (2002-2013)
Worsfold went to apply for the senior coaching roles at both West Coast and Fremantle at the end of the 2001 season.  Eventually, he was appointed to the senior coaching role at West Coast Eagles, when he replaced Ken Judge, who was sacked as West Coast Eagles senior coach at the end of the 2001 season. Worsfold was appointed coach to the club he had formerly played for, where he achieved some level of immediate success, taking the club back to the finals in his first season.  After a string of early finals exits in 2002, 2003 and 2004, Worsfold finally took the club to the 2005 AFL Grand Final, where the Eagles were narrowly defeated by the Sydney Swans by a margin of four points with the final score Sydney Swans 8.10 (58) to West Coast Eagles 7.12 (54).

In the 2006 season, the club finished on top of the ladder after the home and away series, and followed it up with a win in the 2006 AFL Grand Final, when West Coast Eagles defeated the Sydney Swans, this time the margin being a solitary point with the final score West Coast Eagles 12.13 (85) to Sydney Swans 12.12 (84). In doing so, Worsfold became only the fourth person in the history of the AFL/VFL to both captain and later coach the same club to an AFL premiership and the first at the West Coast Eagles. In the 2007 season, West Coast finished third on the ladder. They lost to Port Adelaide in the qualifying final then they got eliminated by Collingwood in the semi final. The 2008 season was not as successful for Worsfold and the West Coast Eagles. With the loss of players Chris Judd and Ben Cousins, West Coast went from third to fifteenth, finishing with four wins and eighteen losses and the lowest percentage in the club's history. In the 2009 season, Worsfold and the West Coast Eagles Football Club made an improvement, finishing eleventh on the ladder with eight wins and fourteen losses.

Injuries and poor form plagued the Eagles' 2010 season, though their overall record was not as bad as in 2008. Worsfold became the fourth man after Reg Hickey, Charlie Sutton and Tony Jewell to coach the same club to both a premiership and a wooden spoon.

However in the 2011 season, the Eagles were back in the finals, finishing 4th at the end of the home and away season and losing a preliminary final against eventual premiers . After the club's top-four finish, Worsfold signed a two-year extension to his contract in October 2011. In the 2012 season, West Coast under Worsfold made the finals again, but were eliminated by Collingwood in the semi-final.  At the conclusion of round ten of the 2012 season, Worsfold passed Mick Malthouse's record for the most games coached at West Coast.

On 5 September 2013, after a disappointing 2013 season for the Eagles, who finished in 13th place on the AFL ladder, Worsfold then stepped down as the senior coach of the West Coast Eagles. Worsfold was then replaced by Adam Simpson as West Coast Eagles senior coach.

In his 11 years with the club, Worsfold coached 281 games for the West Coast Eagles, achieving 149 wins, 2 draws and 130 losses, for a winning percentage of 53.38%.

After the death of a close friend, the  coach Phil Walsh in July 2015, Worsford took an assistant  coaching role for the Adelaide Crows.

Essendon Football Club senior coach (2016-2020)
On 5 October 2015, Worsfold was appointed as the senior coach of the Essendon Football Club. He signed a three-year contract, replacing caretaker senior coach Matthew Egan, who replaced James Hird after Hird resigned during the 2015 season. His first season in the 2016 season at the club proved to be a difficult one, with twelve senior players, including then-captain Jobe Watson and vice-captain Dyson Heppell, receiving suspensions for the 2016 season, as a consequence of Essendon's 2013 doping scandal. Due to this, the club finished on the bottom of the ladder for the first time since 1933, and Worsfold claimed his second wooden spoon as a coach. However, he would take the Bombers back to the finals in the 2017 season, where they suffered a 65-point elimination final defeat at the hands of the Sydney Swans at the Sydney Cricket Ground. In the 2018 season Worsfold took Essendon to finish eleventh on the ladder, missing out of the finals with ten wins and twelve losses. In the 2019 season, Worsfold took Essendon back into the finals again, where they were eliminated by his old side the West Coast Eagles in the elimination final. However in the 2020 season, Essendon's on-field performance under Worsfold, in his final year as senior coach dropped when the club finished thirteenth on the ladder with six wins and ten losses, therefore missing out of the finals. Then at the conclusion of the 2020 season, Worsfold handed over the coaching reins to his assistant coach Rutten as part of the planned transition.

Coaching style 
In an era where most coaches had implemented "the flood" defence by having their players zone back, Worsfold maintained a man-on-man style of game for his West Coast team during the mid-2000s. While this led West Coast to much success in the home and away season, finishing second and first after the home and away rounds in 2005 and 2006 respectively, the strategy, or rather the inflexibility from this strategy also led to criticism at times. Firstly, teams such as the Western Bulldogs and Fremantle were perceived to exploit West Coast's macro-positioning.  However, the most notable example of this criticism came after the qualifying final against Sydney in 2006. However, West Coast did proceed to defeat Sydney in the Grand Final three weeks later.

The 2009 season had seen Worsfold and his coaching department implement the use of both zone defence and man-on-man strategy depending on the situation.

Statistics

Playing statistics

|- style="background-color: #EAEAEA"
! scope="row" style="text-align:center" | 1987
|style="text-align:center;"|
| 24 || 11 || 1 || 0 || 87 || 42 || 129 || 29 || 20 || 0.1 || 0.0 || 7.9 || 3.8 || 11.7 || 2.6 || 1.8
|-
! scope="row" style="text-align:center" | 1988
|style="text-align:center;"|
| 24 || 21 || 4 || 7 || 331 || 135 || 466 || 120 || 40 || 0.2 || 0.3 || 15.8 || 6.4 || 22.2 || 5.7 || 1.9
|- style="background:#eaeaea;"
! scope="row" style="text-align:center" | 1989
|style="text-align:center;"|
| 24 || 20 || 6 || 5 || 258 || 127 || 385 || 101 || 44 || 0.3 || 0.3 || 12.9 || 6.4 || 19.3 || 5.1 || 2.2
|-
! scope="row" style="text-align:center" | 1990
|style="text-align:center;"|
| 24 || 23 || 1 || 2 || 218 || 152 || 370 || 76 || 45 || 0.0 || 0.1 || 9.5 || 6.6 || 16.1 || 3.3 || 2.0
|- style="background:#eaeaea;"
! scope="row" style="text-align:center" | 1991
|style="text-align:center;"|
| 24 || 21 || 1 || 0 || 186 || 130 || 316 || 56 || 31 || 0.0 || 0.0 || 8.9 || 6.2 || 15.0 || 2.7 || 1.5
|-
|style="text-align:center;background:#afe6ba;"|1992†
|style="text-align:center;"|
| 24 || 22 || 1 || 2 || 177 || 117 || 294 || 64 || 47 || 0.0 || 0.1 || 8.0 || 5.3 || 13.4 || 2.9 || 2.1
|- style="background:#eaeaea;"
! scope="row" style="text-align:center" | 1993
|style="text-align:center;"|
| 24 || 19 || 6 || 2 || 197 || 119 || 316 || 56 || 32 || 0.3 || 0.1 || 10.4 || 6.3 || 16.6 || 2.9 || 1.7
|-
|style="text-align:center;background:#afe6ba;"|1994†
|style="text-align:center;"|
| 24 || 19 || 2 || 3 || 127 || 116 || 243 || 41 || 41 || 0.1 || 0.2 || 6.7 || 6.1 || 12.8 || 2.2 || 2.2
|- style="background:#eaeaea;"
! scope="row" style="text-align:center" | 1995
|style="text-align:center;"|
| 24 || 20 || 13 || 2 || 118 || 105 || 223 || 37 || 27 || 0.7 || 0.1 || 5.9 || 5.3 || 11.2 || 1.9 || 1.4
|-
! scope="row" style="text-align:center" | 1996
|style="text-align:center;"|
| 24 || 2 || 0 || 0 || 9 || 11 || 20 || 6 || 0 || 0.0 || 0.0 || 4.5 || 5.5 || 10.0 || 3.0 || 0.0
|- style="background:#eaeaea;"
! scope="row" style="text-align:center" | 1997
|style="text-align:center;"|
| 24 || 14 || 0 || 0 || 80 || 68 || 148 || 35 || 16 || 0.0 || 0.0 || 5.7 || 4.9 || 10.6 || 2.5 || 1.2
|-
! scope="row" style="text-align:center" | 1998
|style="text-align:center;"|
| 24 || 17 || 2 || 3 || 96 || 68 || 164 || 46 || 21 || 0.1 || 0.2 || 5.6 || 4.0 || 9.6 || 2.7 || 1.2
|- class="sortbottom"
! colspan=3| Career
! 209
! 37
! 26
! 1884
! 1190
! 3074
! 667
! 364
! 0.2
! 0.1
! 9.0
! 5.7
! 14.7
! 3.2
! 1.7
|}

Coaching statistics
Statistics are correct to the end of the 2019 season

|- style="background-color: #EAEAEA"
! scope="row" style="font-weight:normal"|2002
|
| 23 || 11 || 12 || 0 || 47.8% || 8 || 16
|-
! scope="row" style="font-weight:normal"|2003
|
| 23 || 12 || 9 || 2 || 56.5% || 7 || 16
|- style="background-color: #EAEAEA"
! scope="row" style="font-weight:normal"|2004
|
| 23 || 13 || 10 || 0 || 56.5% || 7 || 16
|-
! scope="row" style="font-weight:normal"|2005
|
| 25 || 19 || 6 || 0 || 76.0% || 2 || 16
|- style="background-color: #EAEAEA"
|style="text-align:center;background:#afe6ba;"|2006†
|
| 26 || 20 || 6 || 0 || 76.9% || 1 || 16
|-
! scope="row" style="font-weight:normal"|2007
|
| 24 || 15 || 9 || 0 || 62.5% || 3 || 16
|- style="background-color: #EAEAEA"
! scope="row" style="font-weight:normal"|2008
|
| 22 || 4 || 18 || 0 || 18.2% || 15 || 16
|-
! scope="row" style="font-weight:normal"|2009
|
| 22 || 8 || 14 || 0 || 36.4% || 11 || 16
|- style="background-color: #EAEAEA"
! scope="row" style="font-weight:normal"|2010
|
| 22 || 4 || 18 || 0 || 18.2% || 16 || 16
|-
! scope="row" style="font-weight:normal"|2011
|
| 25 || 18 || 7 || 0 || 72.0% || 4 || 17
|- style="background-color: #EAEAEA"
! scope="row" style="font-weight:normal"|2012
|
| 24 || 16 || 8 || 0 || 66.7% || 5 || 18
|-
! scope="row" style="font-weight:normal"|2013
|style="text-align:center;"|
| 22 || 9 || 13 || 0 || 40.9% || 13 || 18
|- style="background-color: #EAEAEA"
! scope="row" style="font-weight:normal"|2016
|
| 22 || 3 || 19 || 0 || 13.6% || 18 || 18
|-
! scope="row" style="font-weight:normal"|2017
|
| 23 || 12 || 11 || 0 || 52.2% || 7 || 18
|- style="background-color: #EAEAEA"
! scope="row" style="font-weight:normal"|2018
|
| 22 || 12 || 10 || 0 || 54.4% || 11 || 18
|- style="background-color: #EAEAEA"
! scope="row" style="font-weight:normal"|2019
|
| 23 || 12 || 11 || 0 || 54.2% || 8 || 18
|- class="sortbottom"
! colspan=2| Career totals
! 348
! 188
! 181
! 2
! 50.6%
! colspan=2|
|}

Honours and achievements

Playing honours
Team
VFL/AFL Premiership (West Coast): 1992 (C), 1994 (C)
McClelland Trophy (West Coast): 1991 (C), 1994 (C)
Individual
West Coast Club Champion Award (later named the John Worsfold Medal): 1988
West Coast – Best Clubman Award: 1993, 1998
Western Australia State of Origin Captain: 1992-1993
WAFL Rookie of the Year Award: 1986
South Fremantle F.C. – Best First Year Player Award: 1986
Western Australia – Under 18 Team: 1985
West Coast Captain: 1991-1998
West Australian Hall of Fame Inductee: 2004

Coaching honours
Team
VFL/AFL Premiership (West Coast): 2006
McClelland Trophy (West Coast): 2006
Individual
Jock McHale Medal: 2006
All-Australian: 2006
AFLCA Coach of the Year Award: 2006, 2011

Personal life
Worsfold married his wife, Georgina, in 1994, with whom he has three children: Sophie, Charlie, and Grace. Outside of football, he completed a Bachelor of Pharmacy at the Curtin University of Technology in 1989, and later worked as a pharmacist for an amount of time. In 2009, Worsfold completed a course at INSEAD, a business administration school in Fontainebleau, France. and occasionally works as a motivational speaker. Worsfold's younger brother, Peter Worsfold, played 31 games for the Brisbane Bears, and later captained South Fremantle.

References

External links

1968 births
Living people
All-Australian coaches
South Fremantle Football Club players
John Worsfold Medal winners
West Coast Eagles coaches
West Coast Eagles Premiership coaches
West Coast Eagles players
West Coast Eagles Premiership players
Western Australian State of Origin players
West Australian Football Hall of Fame inductees
INSEAD alumni
Australian pharmacists
Curtin University alumni
Australian rules footballers from Perth, Western Australia
Australia international rules football team players
Essendon Football Club coaches
Two-time VFL/AFL Premiership players
One-time VFL/AFL Premiership coaches